Emilio J. M. de Carvalho is a retired Angolan Bishop of the United Methodist Church, elected to that office in 1972.

Emilio was born August 3, 1933 in Quiongua, Malanje, Angola. Carvalho earned his B.D in December 1958 at the Faculdade de Teologia da Igreja Methodista in São Paulo, Brazil. At the same time, he served as the assistant pastor for two local churches. Carvalho later earned a M.A. degree from Northwestern University (June 1960). Carvalho was ordained a deacon in The Methodist Church on June 3, 1960 by Bishop H.C. Northcott at the Wisconsin Annual Conference.

The Rev. de Carvalho returned to Angola and was appointed pastor of the Central Methodist Church in Luanda. In 1965, he became a professor and the principal of the Emmanuel Theological Seminary in Dondi, Angola. He was ordained an elder in The Methodist Church 2 January 1966 by Bishop H.P. Andreassen at the Angola Annual Conference.

Rev. Emilio J. M. de Carvalho was elected to the episcopacy of the United Methodist Church at the Africa Central Conference session held in Limbe, Malawi, August 1972. He was consecrated a bishop by Bishop Escrivao A. Zunguze on October 21, 1972 in Luanda. Bishop de Carvalho was assigned the Angola episcopal area. Carvalho formally retired on September 1, 2000.

See also
 List of bishops of the United Methodist Church

References

 InfoServ, the official information service of The United Methodist Church.  
 The Council of Bishops of the United Methodist Church

External links
 Photo of Bishop de Carvalho

1933 births
Living people
Angolan academics
Angolan expatriates in Brazil
Angolan expatriates in the United States
Angolan United Methodist bishops
Northwestern University alumni
People from Malanje Province